P. domestica may refer to:
 Philoeca domestica, a synonym for Malthonica ferruginea, a spider species
 Prunus domestica, a tree species